Harborne is an area of south-west Birmingham, England. It is a Birmingham City Council ward in the formal district and in the parliamentary constituency of Birmingham Edgbaston.

Geography 
Harborne lies to the west of Edgbaston, to the north of Selly Oak, to the east of Quinton, and to the south of the Bearwood and Warley areas of neighbouring Sandwell.

Harts Green is an area of Harborne.

History 

There is evidence of a Roman fort around the Queen Elizabeth Hospital Birmingham and Metchley Park, near Harborne.

The earliest written mention of Harborne is an entry in the Domesday Book of 1086, however the settlement pre-dates this. The spelling of Harborne has appeared with several variations through the centuries, and the derivation of the place name has often been disputed. One of the more probable suggestions is 'boundary brook', although 'high brow' and 'dirty brook' are also possibilities.

Harborne is a Victorian suburb with a large stock of housing dating from pre-1900 (found mainly around the High Street), and the early 20th century. The oldest part of what is known locally as 'Harborne Village' is centred on St Peter's Church, (Church of England), Old Church Road, which dates from Anglo-Saxon times (St Chad preached there) and whose tower was (re)constructed in the 14th century.

As a non-Quaker area of the city, Harborne became well-supplied with public houses compared to nearby areas such as Edgbaston and Bournville. There is a famous "Harborne Run" pub crawl consisting of from 10 to 15 pubs (the agreed itinerary varies).

St Mary's Church was the first Roman Catholic congregation formed by the Passionists who worshiped in a disused Methodist Chapel on Harborne High Street from 1870. Building work started on the current church, in Vivian Road, on 8 September 1875 and it opened on 6 February 1877. 
The Augustinians (Austin Friars) arrived at St Mary's in 1973 to a growing Catholic population and work on a new church, attached to the side of the old church, started on 1 August 1977 and was finished in 56 weeks. The St Mary's Parish Centre was opened in 1990 and is next door to the church.

Harborne railway station, at the end of the short Harborne Branch Line off the LMS Birmingham-Wolverhampton line at Ladywood, opened on 10 August 1874. It closed to passengers on 26 November 1934 and to freight traffic in November 1963. It is now the Harborne Walkway, a two-mile (3 km) nature walk and cycling route from Harborne to Ladywood, where the canal can be followed either to Birmingham or Wolverhampton.

Harborne became part of the county borough of Birmingham and thus transferred from Staffordshire to Warwickshire in 1891 by the Local Govt. Bd.'s Prov. Orders Conf. (No. 13) Act, 54 & 55 Vic. c. 161 (local act), or in 1894 It then became part of the West Midlands in 1974 by the Local Government Act 1972.

Demographics 
The 2011 census revealed that 23,001 lived in Harborne and that 17% of people were aged under 16, 69% were aged between 16 and 64, while 14% were aged over 65. The minority ethnic population made up 33% of the ward's population, compared with 41% for Birmingham. The census found that 75% (11,997) of the population aged 16 to 74 were working or seeking work, this compared with 69% for Birmingham.

Education
There are four secondary schools in Harborne: Baskerville School, Harborne Academy, Lordswood Boys' School and Lordswood Girls' School.

There are six primary schools: Birmingham Blue Coat School, Chad Vale Primary School (which both sit on the border between Harborne and Edgbaston), Harborne Primary School, St Mary's Catholic Primary School, St Peter's Church of England Primary School, and Welsh House Farm Community School.

Harborne is currently served by Harborne Library which formally opened on 12 November 1892, occupying a former Masonic Hall, which was built in 1879.

Harborne Primary School

Harborne Primary School is a coeducational primary school for pupils aged 4 to 11. As of September 2014, the school had 629 students.

The Edwardian infant school opened in 1902; a junior school was added to the site in 1912. In September 2000 the two schools were merged, forming Harborne Primary School as it is today.

On 27 April 2011, a roof fire caused significant damage to the structure of the junior school. More than 60 firefighters tackled the blaze. None of the pupils or staff were injured. The infant school reopened a week later, with the juniors moved to nearby Harborne Hall hotel for six months whilst the rebuild took place. Birmingham City Council awarded the school £1.3 million for the rebuild project, which was completed a year later, in April 2012.

In 2015 the school submitted plans to build an annex site, on the ground of Lordswood Girls' School, to expand the school from 630 to 1050 places. The plans were opposed by residents of the nearby Hagley Road Retirement Village. Further plans were submitted for a site on Court Oak Road, near Queen Alexandra College, to expand the school to 840 pupil places. In preparation for the expansion, the school will accept a further 30 reception children on its main site in September 2018. The one form entry annexe opened in September 2019.

Politics 

Harborne ward forms part of the Birmingham Edgbaston constituency at Westminster, represented by Labour's Preet Gill since 2017. At local government level, Harborne ward is represented on Birmingham City Council by one councillor from the Labour Party and one councillor from the Conservative Party.
The former leader of Birmingham City Council Mike Whitby was a councillor in Harborne from 1997 to 2014 and was made a life peer taking the title of Baron Whitby, of Harborne in the City of Birmingham.

The ward has a Ward Support Officer.

Public transport

Buses

Harborne is served by the following bus routes:
 National Express West Midlands: 10S, 11A, 11C, 19, 23, 24, 48, 76

Trains

The suburb had a railway station which opened in 1874. The station however closed to passenger traffic in 1934 and to freight in 1963. Since the closure of Harborne railway station, Harborne's closest station has been University which is on the Cross-City Line, as well as West Midlands Trains' longer-distance services to Hereford and CrossCountry services to Cardiff and Nottingham. There are frequent services to Birmingham New Street.

Culture

Sport and leisure
 Harborne Hockey Club was founded in 1903 and is the highest ranked Club in the local area. The club has six ladies and five mens teams as well as a thriving youth section. It is the only club in the West Midlands to be affiliated to Flyerz Hockey which actively supports people with disabilities play sport.

Harborne's tennis court facilities can be found in Moorpool at The Circle and on Moor Pool Avenue. Harborne has three bowling greens, two at public houses (Green Man and The Bell) and one in Moorpool. Grove Park and Queens Park are both in Harborne. There are two golf courses (Harborne Golf Course and Harborne Municipal Golf Course), as well as a cricket ground. When the swimming pool was rebuilt and opened in 2012, it was Birmingham's first new swimming pool for more than twenty years; the centre also houses fitness facilities. Harborne is bordered by Bourn Brook Walkway on the south and Harborne Walkway to the north east.

Food and drink

Harborne Run
The Harborne Mile is a pub crawl from one end of Harborne High Street (and ancillary roads) to the other, involving all or some of the public houses listed below.

Current pubs

Former pubs

Notable residents

 David Cox (1783–1859), an English landscape painter of the Birmingham School.
 Thomas Attwood (1783–1856), banker, economist, political campaigner and MP.
 Thomas Baker (1809–1864), a Midlands landscape painter and watercolourist
 Elihu Burritt (1810–1879), an American diplomat, philanthropist and social activist.
 Edward Augustus Freeman (1823–1892), an English historian.
 Ethel Arnold (1865–1930), journalist, author and lecturer on female suffrage.
 Granville Bantock (1868–1946), composer of classical music.
 Alfred Priest (1874–1929), portrait painter.
 Francis William Aston FRS (1877–1945), chemist and physicist, won the 1922 Nobel Prize in Chemistry.
 Sir Henry Rushbury KCVO CBE RA (1889–1968), painter and etcher.
 George Edward Hunt  (1892–1960), an Arts and Crafts jeweller.
 Hester Adrian, Baroness Adrian DBE (1899–1966), mental health worker.
 W. H. Auden (1907–1973), a British-American poet.
 Paul Grice (1913–1988), a philosopher of language
 Tony Shryane MBE (1919–2003), BBC radio programme producer
 Steve Gibbons (born 1941), singer-songwriter, guitarist and bandleader
 Mike Whitby (born 1948), politician, peer and former leader of Birmingham City Council
 Adrian Goldberg (born 1961), journalist, radio and TV presenter.
 Corrinne Wicks (born 1968), actress.
 Ben Richards (born 1972), stage and TV actor and dancer.
 Ocean Colour Scene (formed in 1989), rock band.

Sport 
 John James (born 1934), former footballer with 130 appearances
 Johnny Giles (born 1940), former footballer and manager.
 Dennis Amiss MBE (born 1943), a former English cricketer, played 50 Test matches.

See also
 Harborne carnival
 Chad Valley, Birmingham
 Harborne Primary School
 Harborne Railway
 Harborne railway station
 Harborne Reserve
 Moor Pool
 St Mary's Church, Harborne, Birmingham
 St Peter's Church, Harborne

References

External links 
 Birmingham City Council: Harborne Ward
 Early history
 The Harborne Society
 Harborne Village Partnership
 St Mary's RC Church, Vivian Road, Harborne.

 
Areas of Birmingham, West Midlands
Conservation areas in England